Vernet is a surname. Notable people with the surname include:

Painters
Antoine Vernet (1689-1753), French painter, father of Claude Joseph Vernet
 Claude Joseph Vernet (1714–1789), French painter
 Antoine Charles Horace Vernet (1758–1835), also known as Carle Vernet, French painter, the son of Claude Joseph Vernet
 Emile Jean Horace Vernet (1789–1863), French painter, the son of Antoine Charles Horace Vernet

Other
 Daniel Vernet (c. 1945–2018), French journalist
 Helen Vernet (1876–1956), British gambler
 Jacob Vernet (1698–1789), Swiss theologian
 José María Vernet (born 1944), Argentine politician
 Louis Vernet (archer) (1870–1946), French Olympic athlete
 Luis Vernet (1791–1871), Appointed Military and Civil Commander of Puerto Luis (1829–1832) by the Republic of Buenos Aires

See also
 Le Vernet (disambiguation)

Surnames of French origin